Sylvain Pierre Kastendeuch (born 31 August 1963) is a French former professional footballer who played as a defender. He was capped nine times by the France national team. He is the player with the sixth-most appearances in the French championship. In his entire career, he never received a red card.

Honours
Metz
Coupe de la Ligue: 1996

Individual
UNFP Honorary Award: 2011

Orders
Chevalier of the Légion d'honneur: 2013

References and notes

1963 births
Living people
People from Hayange
Sportspeople from Moselle (department)
French footballers
France international footballers
Association football defenders
FC Metz players
Red Star F.C. players
AS Saint-Étienne players
Toulouse FC players
Ligue 1 players
Ligue 2 players
Chevaliers of the Légion d'honneur
Footballers from Grand Est